Everett O. Inbody (born September 13, 1945) is a former Judge of the Nebraska Court of Appeals.

Education

Inbody earned his Bachelor of Science from the University of Nebraska in 1967 and his Juris Doctor from the University of Nebraska College of Law in 1970. He also holds diplomas for judicial skills and humanities and judging from the American Academy of Judicial Education.

Legal career

He began his legal career as a deputy county attorney in Saunders County. He was in private practice in Wahoo from 1970 to 1986. From 1970 to 1978 he was also Nebraska Crime Commission director of regions 4, 5 and 6. He was a 5th Judicial District county court judge from 1986 to 1991 and then a district court judge from 1991 to 1995. He joined the Nebraska Court of Appeals in 1995.

Service on Nebraska Court of Appeals

He was appointed to the court by Governor Ben Nelson. He joined the court on April 28, 1995, and served as chief judge from 2004 to 2014. After serving as chief, he resumed his duties as an associate judge. He retired from active service on January 1, 2018.

References

External links
Profile on Nebraska Judicial Branch website

1945 births
Living people
20th-century American judges
20th-century American lawyers
21st-century American judges
Nebraska lawyers
Nebraska state court judges
University of Nebraska–Lincoln alumni